Allen Aaron Cook (April 20, 1832 – February 12, 1899), usually known as A. A. Cook, was an American architect who came to Sacramento, California in 1870.  He designed numerous buildings around the state, including a number which are listed on the U.S. National Register of Historic Places for their architecture.

Biography
Cook was born on April 20, 1832, in Chenango County, New York. His parents moved to Albany, New York in that year, which is where Cook grew up and attended school. He married Maria Midler of Pennsylvania on January 12, 1870, in Douglas, NE; they had six children, four of whom survived to adulthood. Two other children died of measles on 21 March 21, 1882 and are buried in the Old Sacramento City Cemetery. He died in Shingle Springs, El Dorado County, California, on February 12, 1899. He is buried in the Old Sacramento City Cemetery.

Selected works
the Wheatland Masonic Temple, in Wheatland, California, NRHP-listed
the Odd Fellows Building (1882–83) in Red Bluff, California, NRHP-listed
Cone and Kimball Building at 747 Main St. in Red Bluff, NRHP-listed
Pleasants Ranch at 8212 Pleasants Valley Rd. in Vacaville, California, NRHP-listed
courthouse at Redding
Stansbury Home (1883), Chico, California, NRHP-listed
Hotel DeVilbiss (1899-90), 2-10 Main Street, Winters, California, a contributing building in the NRHP-listed Downtown Winters Historic District
state prison at Folsom, California
Western Hotel, Sacramento, a listed California Historical Landmark
Hale's Block, Sacramento
county hospitals in Colusa, Mendocino and Tehama
churches at Redding, Sacramento, Stockton, and Wheatland
Nevada State Asylum

References

1832 births
1899 deaths
People from Chenango County, New York
People from Sacramento, California
19th-century American architects
History of Sacramento, California